Elixir is a live album by American avant-garde jazz composer, bandleader, and multi-instrumentalist Hal Russell's Chemical Feast recorded in Chicago in 1979 and released posthumously on the Atavistic label in 2001.

Reception

The Allmusic review awarded the album 4 stars stating "This CD possesses historical value as a rare document of the non-AACM Chicago avant-garde scene prior to its 1990s resurgence but the real reason to get it is that it just plain smokes". On All About Jazz Derek Taylor noted "The recording isn’t going to win any laurels for clean fidelity, but its very existence precludes any finger waving at its shortcomings. Russell’s discography is sparse enough as it currently stands. The prospect of future releases like this one is made all the more appealing considering he’s no longer with us and the source of the reservoir is his own personal stash".

Track listing
All compositions by Hal Russell except as indicated 
 "Broadway Blues" (Ornette Coleman) - 15:57   
 "Manas" - 6:15   
 "Four Free" - 10:28   
 "Four Winds" (Dave Holland) - 15:27   
 "Kahoutek" (Mars Williams) - 7:20   
 "March of the Cellulite Goddesses" (Williams) - 7:25   
 "Airborne" (Coleman) - 7:02

Personnel
Hal Russell - tenor saxophone, zither, drums
Mars Williams, Spider Middleman  - saxophones
Russ Ditusa - bass
George Southgate - vibraphone, drums

References

Hal Russell live albums
2001 live albums
Atavistic Records live albums